Gudambong is a mountain of Chungcheongbuk-do, South Korea. It has an elevation of 330 metres.

See also
List of mountains of Korea

References

Mountains of South Korea
Mountains of North Chungcheong Province